Barron Patterson McCune (February 19, 1915 – September 10, 2008) was a United States district judge of the United States District Court for the Western District of Pennsylvania.

Education and career

McCune was born in West Newton, Pennsylvania in 1915 and attended Washington & Jefferson College in Washington, Pennsylvania. As a student, he submitted jokes told by history professor Dr. Alfred Sweet to Judge magazine, splitting the $2 check from the publication. He was a member of Lambda Chi Alpha fraternity, as well as the Buskin Club, a theater organization. McCune received an Artium Baccalaureus degree from Washington & Jefferson College in 1935. As McCune then took a job with Firestone Tire and Rubber Company in Akron, Ohio, his father encouraged him to study law. He entered  University of Pennsylvania Law School and earned a Bachelor of Laws in 1938. After graduation, he rejected a job offer in Philadelphia, but he felt that the $1,800 salary wasn't enough to live on. He returned to Washington in 1939 to work in his own private practice, serving in the United States Naval Reserve as a gunnery officer from 1942 to 1948. In 1964, he became a judge of the Court of Common Pleas in Washington County, Pennsylvania.

Federal judicial service

McCune was nominated by President Richard Nixon on December 8, 1970, to the United States District Court for the Western District of Pennsylvania, to a new seat authorized by 84 Stat. 294. He was confirmed by the United States Senate on December 16, 1970, and received his commission on December 18, 1970. He assumed senior status on April 1, 1985 and took inactive senior status in 1995. His service terminated on September 10, 2008, due to his death.

Notable cases

During McCune's tenure on the court, he heard a wide variety of cases, including a case involving cocaine trafficking in Major League Baseball and an insurance law case determining whether certain women with breast cancer had insurance coverage for bone marrow transplants. He held in favor of Allegheny County in a challenge by the American Civil Liberties Union to a display of the Nativity scene at the Allegheny County Courthouse.

Other service

McCune was active with his alma mater, Washington & Jefferson College, serving on the Board of Trustees for 40 years, including a time as president of the board from 1976 to 1983. He was an avid fan of the Washington & Jefferson football team, attending every home game until the age of 92.

Personal

McCune was married to his wife, Edna Markey, from 1943 until her death in 1999. They had three sons. He was a member of the Church of the Covenant. He was known for being a large man, standing 6 feet 4 inches and weighing 215 pounds, and his judicial demeanor was marked by his "one-liners, an imposing demeanor, and a penchant for cigars." He died on September 10, 2008 in Washington, Pennsylvania.

Notes

References

Sources
 

1915 births
2008 deaths
Washington & Jefferson College alumni
Judges of the United States District Court for the Western District of Pennsylvania
American Presbyterians
United States district court judges appointed by Richard Nixon
20th-century American judges
University of Pennsylvania Law School alumni
Judges of the Pennsylvania Courts of Common Pleas
United States Navy personnel of World War II
Pennsylvania Republicans
Pennsylvania lawyers
People from Washington County, Pennsylvania
Washington & Jefferson College trustees
United States Navy officers
People from West Newton, Pennsylvania